The 1921 Pacific Tigers football team represented the College of the Pacific—now known as the University of the Pacific—in Stockton, California as an independent during the 1921 college football season. Led by first-year head coach Erwin Righter, Pacific compiled a record of 3–3, the first time the program had more than one win in a season. They scored 117 points on the year, more than their total from the previous six seasons combined.

Schedule

References

Pacific
Pacific Tigers football seasons
Pacific Tigers football